Debashish Goswami  is an Indian mathematician.  He obtained his PhD degree from Indian Statistical Institute under the supervision of Kalyan Bidhan Sinha. He was awarded the Shanti Swarup Bhatnagar Prize for Science and Technology in 2012, the highest science award in India, in the mathematical sciences category.

Awards and honors
INSA medal for Young Scientists (2004) 
B. M. Birla Science Prize in Mathematics for the year 2006
 Swarnajayanti Fellowship from the Dept. of Science and Technology of Govt. of India in 2009

References

20th-century Indian mathematicians
Recipients of the Shanti Swarup Bhatnagar Award in Mathematical Science